Endotricha simplex is a species of snout moth in the genus Endotricha. It was described by Anthonie Johannes Theodorus Janse in 1924, and is known from the Moluccas and the Louisiade Archipelago.

Subspecies
Endotricha simplex simplex (Moluccas)
Endotricha simplex rosselli Whalley, 1963 (Louisiade Archipelago)

References

Endotrichini
Moths described in 1924